Owen Roe (born 30 May 1959) is an Irish actor, playwright and theatrical director.

Early life
Roe was born in Dublin in 1959.

Career

Roe studied at the Oscar School of Acting and the Brendan Smith Academy in the late 1970s.

Roe has been a prolific stage actor for decades. He won an Irish Theatre Award for playing Claudius in Hamlet. He also won a Special Tribute Award at The Irish Times Theatre Awards 2019. He also wrote one play, Fear of Feathers, staged at the Andrews Lane Theatre in 1991.

On TV, Roe has appeared on Scarlett, The Ambassador, Ballykissangel, Rásaí na Gaillimhe, Penny Dreadful, Vikings and Fair City., and as Oliver Cromwell in The History Channel Documentary "Cromwell: God's Executioner" based on the book by Professor Micheál Ó Siochrú 

He has appeared in several films, mostly made in Ireland, including Michael Collins (as Arthur Griffith), Intermission and Breakfast on Pluto. He has received three IFTA nominations.

On radio, Roe was one-third of the Scrap Saturday political satire series, and is best remembered for his impression of P. J. Mara, loyal adviser to Charles Haughey. He also appeared on Baldi (BBC Radio 4) as Inspector Rynne.

Personal life
Roe lives in Dublin. He is married to the actress and writer Michèle Forbes; they have two children.

References

External links
 

1959 births
Living people
20th-century Irish actors
21st-century Irish actors
Actors from Dublin (city)
Irish stage actors
Irish film actors
Irish television actors
Irish theatre directors
20th-century Irish dramatists and playwrights
Irish male dramatists and playwrights